The Bass Pyramid, part of the Furneaux Group, is a small, two sectioned oval, steep-sided  unpopulated granite island, located in Bass Strait, lying north of the Flinders Island and south of the Kent Group, in Tasmania, Australia. A rock bridge connects the two sections.

The island was used intermittently from the 1940s until 1988 as a bombing and shelling target by the Australian airforce and navy.  On 5 April 1978 the island was proclaimed part of a nature reserve.

Recorded breeding seabird and wader species include fairy prion, common diving-petrel, Pacific gull, silver gull, Australasian gannet and sooty oystercatcher.  It is also a haul-out site for Australian fur seals. The seals were hunted here in the 19th century. The dangers of the site resulted in at least three sealers losing their lives here.

See also

 List of islands of Tasmania

References

Furneaux Group
Protected areas of Tasmania
Islands of Bass Strait
Islands of North East Tasmania
Seal hunting